Patricia Ching Yee Chong is a Chinese actress from Hong Kong. Chong is known for  Sword Stained with Royal Blood, the 1985 Wuxia TV series that was broadcast on TVB.

Early life 
On December 13, 1959, Chong was born in Hong Kong.

Career 
In 1980, Chong started her acting career. Chong is Ah Ling, an innocent and naive girl who is raped, in The Beasts, a horror thriller film directed by Dennis Yu.

In 1985, Chong is Wan Ching-ching (or Wen Ching-ching) in Sword Stained with Royal Blood, the 1985 Wuxia TV series (TVB) adapted from Louis Cha's novel Sword Stained with Royal Blood. Chong's character is the daughter in the Wan ) family. In the 1977 TV series of the same title, her character was played by Wen Hsueh-erh. In the 2007 TV series (in mandarin) of the same title, her character was played by Eva Shengyi Huang. There are also several film adaptation of the similar and same titles, her character was played by Sheung-koon Kwan-wai (1958/1959 Sword of Blood and Valour in Cantonese), Wen Hsueh-erh (1981 Sword Stained with Royal Blood in Mandarin), and Elsie Yeh (1993 The Sword Stained with Royal Blood in Cantonese).

In 1995, Chong is Carrie Chin in Summer Snow, the award winning film directed by Ann Hui.

In 1997, Chong retired as an actress in Hong Kong.

Filmography

Films 
 1980 No Big Deal
 1980 The Savour
 1980 The Beasts - Ah Ling 
 1981 The Security
 1982 Food for the Sharks
 1982 Once Upon a Rainbow - Angie
 1983 My Mother
 1984 Law with Two Phases - Kit's girlfriend.
 1984 Wrong Wedding Trail - Miss Cheng's other sister
 1987 Lady in Black - Ann Cheung
 1991 Feud Within the Truth 
 1992 The Truth of a Killer 
 1995 Summer Snow

Television series 
 1982 Soldier of Fortune - Poon Hiu-ton 
 1983 The Superpower 
 1985 The Feud That Never Was
 1985 Sword Stained with Royal Blood - Wan Ching-ching 
 1986 The Yang's Saga - Daughter of Poon Hung and Concubine Poon

Personal life 
Chong is married and has one daughter. Chong and her family lived in Hong Kong and Canada.

References

External links 
 Ching Yee Chong at imdb.com
 Patricia Chong Jing Yee at hkcinemagic.com
 Chong Ching-yee at bfi.org.uk
 Chong Ching-yee at tcm.com

1959 births
Hong Kong film actresses
Hong Kong television actresses
Living people